The first elections for the Assembly of Experts in Tehran Province was held on 10 December 1982  to elect 14 representatives in the constituency. Only 17 candidates –all Khomeinists– competed for the seats, of whom 13 were unanimously endorsed by the Combatant Clergy Association, the Society of Seminary Teachers of Qom and the Islamic Propagation Office of Qom Seminary.

The voter turnout was declared 71.85% in the constituency.

Results

References 

Elections in Tehran
1980s in Tehran
Uncontested elections
1982 elections in Iran